Sang-e Sefid (also Romanized as Sang Sefid; also known as Gol-e Zard) is a village in Nahr-e Mian Rural District, Zalian District, Shazand County, Markazi Province, Iran. At the 2006 census, its population was 431, in 101 families.

References 

Populated places in Shazand County